Korkin (from корка meaning crust) is a Russian masculine surname, its feminine counterpart is Korkina. It may refer to
Aleksandr Korkin (1837–1908), Russian mathematician
Gennady Korkin (born 1963), Russian association football player

See also
Khorkin

Russian-language surnames